Naing Lin Tun (born 16 June 1995) is a footballer from Burma, and a defender for the Myanmar national under-23 football team and Magwe.

He currently plays for Magwe in Myanmar National League.

References

1995 births
Living people
Burmese footballers
Myanmar international footballers
Ayeyawady United F.C. players
Magway FC players
Association football defenders
Competitors at the 2017 Southeast Asian Games
Southeast Asian Games competitors for Myanmar